Valleyview Airport  is located  south of Valleyview, Alberta, Canada.

References

External links
Place to Fly on COPA's Places to Fly airport directory

Registered aerodromes in Alberta
Municipal District of Greenview No. 16